Kelly Albright (born January 20, 1987) is an American politician and teacher who served as a Democratic member of the Oklahoma House of Representatives from the 95th district from 2018 to 2020. She lost her 2020 reelection campaign to the Republican candidate Max Wolfley.

Education and teaching career
Albright earned her bachelor's degree in elementary education in 2014 from the University of Oklahoma, where she was a member of Alpha Phi Omega.
Prior to running for office, she worked as a 3rd grade teacher at Dove Science Academy in Oklahoma City and she participated in the 2018 Oklahoma teacher walkout and protest at the Oklahoma State Capitol.

Oklahoma House of Representatives
Albright served in the Oklahoma House of Representatives between 2018 and 2020. She represented Midwest City. While in office, Albright authored a bill to require state facilities to have a public diaper changing station available, however the bill stalled and never passed.
She lost re-election to Republican Max Wolfley in November 2020.

Committees
2018-2020
General Government committee
Transportation committee
Common Education committee
Veterans and Military Affairs committee

Electoral history

References

1987 births
21st-century American politicians
21st-century American women politicians
Democratic Party members of the Oklahoma House of Representatives
Living people
People from Midwest City, Oklahoma
Schoolteachers from Oklahoma
University of Oklahoma alumni
Women state legislators in Oklahoma